Atteva zebrina is a moth of the Attevidae family. It is found in Brazil.

External links
A review of the New World Atteva (Walker) moths (Yponomeutidae, Attevinae)

Attevidae